The Samuel Douglass House is a historic house located at 215 North Main Street in Payson, Utah, United States. It was updated to include Bungalow/craftsman architecture in 1912, and won a high school civics class award.

Description
The -story house was built in 1874, and has since been substantially altered. It was listed on the National Register of Historic Places on August 21, 1992. It is also a contributing building in the Payson Historic District, which was listed on the National Register in 2007.

See also

 National Register of Historic Places in Utah County, Utah

References

External links

Houses completed in 1874
Georgian architecture in Utah
Houses on the National Register of Historic Places in Utah
Houses in Utah County, Utah
National Register of Historic Places in Utah County, Utah
Buildings and structures in Payson, Utah
Individually listed contributing properties to historic districts on the National Register in Utah